The Steve Martin Brothers, released on LP in 1981, is a comedy album by American actor Steve Martin. The album, the last stand-up comedy album released by Martin, was released on compact disc in 2006 by Wounded Bird Records.

Based on the album cover photos, the title of the album refers to the two sides of Martin that are showcased on the album: The Rich Comedian, showcased on Side One, and the Peace-Loving Hippie Banjo player, showcased on Side Two. Although his self-taught banjo playing had been featured on previous albums, it was never showcased until this album.

This was the only album on which he brought in other writers to help him with his material, including Saturday Night Live writer Jack Handey. When this album was released, he announced that he intended to never perform stand-up comedy again.

The record became his lowest peaking album to date on the Billboard Pop Albums Chart, peaking at No. 135. The album was also his lowest selling album to date as well, and went uncertified.

Despite its poor reception, the album was nominated in 1982 for a Grammy Award for Best Comedy Album.

Track listing

Side one
Cocktail Show, Vegas - 7:37
1. American Photography
2. A Scientific Question
3. What I Believe
4. A Show Biz Moment
Comedy Store, Hollywood - 11:27
5. The Real Me
6. Love God
7. Make the Rent
8. The Gospel Maniacs

Side two
 Sally Goodin'  – 1:08
 Saga of the Old West  – 2:30
 John Henry  – 2:00
 Saga (Reprise)  – 1:05
 Pitkin County Turn Around  – 1:07
 Hoedown at Alice's  – 2:23
 Song of Perfect Spaces  – 3:16
 Freddie's Lilt, Parts I and II  – 3:47
 Waterbound  – 1:16
 Banana Banjo  – 1:07

The entirety of Side Two was recorded in August 1971.

Personnel
Produced by William E. McEuen
Mastered by Greg Fulginiti

1981 albums
Steve Martin albums
Warner Records albums
Wounded Bird Records albums
Live comedy albums
1980s comedy albums
Comedy albums by American artists
Stand-up comedy albums